2MASS J15031961+2525196 (2MASS 1503+2525) is a nearby brown dwarf of spectral type T5.5, located in the constellation of Boötes at approximately 20.7 light-years from Earth.

History of observations

Discovery
2MASS 1503+2525 was discovered in 2003 by Adam J. Burgasser et al. in wide-field search for T dwarfs using the Two Micron All Sky Survey (2MASS).

Distance
Originally the most precise distance estimate of 2MASS 1503+2525 is a trigonometric parallax, published by Dupuy and Liu in 2012: 157.2 ± 2.2 mas, corresponding to a distance 6.36 ± 0.09 pc, or 20.7 ± 0.3 ly. The parallax was further refined by Gaia mission in 2018 to 154.9208mas. The brown dwarf 2MASS 1503+2525 lies in local void 6.5 parsecs across, where relatively few stars and brown dwarfs are located.

Physical properties
The 2MASS J15031961+2525196 is the spectral standard of the spectral class T5.

References

Boötes
Brown dwarfs
Free-floating substellar objects
T-type stars
J15031961+2525196
Astronomical objects discovered in 2003